Columnea is a genus of around 200 species of epiphytic herbs and shrubs in the family Gesneriaceae, native to the tropics of the Americas and the Caribbean. The tubular or oddly shaped flowers are usually large and brightly colored – usually red, yellow, or orange – sometimes resembling a fish in shape. A common name is flying goldfish plants (see also the related Nematanthus) due to the unusual flower shape.

The genus was named by Carl Linnaeus after the Latinized spelling of the name of the 16th-century Italian botanist Fabio Colonna (Latin: Fabius Columnus).

The segregate genus Bucinellina is considered by many botanists a synonym of Columnea. A full list of the species now accepted in the genus, along with their synonyms, can be found at the World Checklist of Gesneriaceae.

Cultivation
Columnea species grow as epiphytic plants in the wild and require bright light, good air circulation, and a well-drained growing medium that is allowed to dry out slightly between waterings.  They are very tolerant of underpotting and seem to bloom best when potbound.  Most are tropical plants and are easy to grow under indoor or greenhouse conditions but some species come from high altitudes and require cooler temperatures to grow well or bloom.  Many of the species are seasonal bloomers, but hybrids and cultivars can be more or less continuously blooming.

The hybrid Columnea × banksii has gained the Royal Horticultural Society's Award of Garden Merit.

Species

The species classified under Columnea include the following:

Columnea albiflora L.P. Kvist & L.E. Skog 
Columnea aliena (C.V. Morton) C.V. Morton 
Columnea allenii C.V. Morton 
Columnea ambigua (Urb.) B.D. Morley 
Columnea ampliata (Wiehler) L.E. Skog 
Columnea angustata (Wiehler) L.E. Skog 
Columnea anisophylla DC. 
Columnea antiocana (Wiehler) J.F. Sm. 
Columnea argentea Griseb. 
Columnea arguta C.V. Morton 
Columnea asteroloma (Wiehler) L.E. Skog 
Columnea atahualpae J.F. Sm. & L.E. Skog 
Columnea aurantia Wiehler 
Columnea aurea Warsz., nom. nud. 
Columnea bilabiata Seem. 
Columnea billbergiana Beurl.
Columnea bivalvis J.L. Clark & M. Amaya
Columnea brenneri (Wiehler) B.D. Morley
Columnea brevipila Urb.
Columnea byrsina (Wiehler) L.P. Kvist & L.E. Skog
Columnea calotricha Donn. Sm.
Columnea capillosa L.P. Kvist & L.E. Skog
Columnea cerropirrana (Wiehler) L.E. Skog
Columnea chiricana Wiehler
Columnea chrysotricha L.E. Skog & L.P. Kvist
Columnea ciliata (Wiehler) L.P. Kvist & L.E. Skog
Columnea citriflora L.E. Skog
Columnea cobana Donn. Sm.
Columnea colombiana (Wiehler) L.P. Kvist & L.E. Skog
Columnea consanguinea Hanst. 
Columnea coronata M. Amaya, L.E. Skog & L.P. Kvist
Columnea coronocrypta M. Amaya, L.E. Skog & L.P. Kvist
Columnea crassa C.V. Morton
Columnea crassicaulis (Wiehler) L.P. Kvist & L.E. Skog
Columnea crassifolia Brongn. ex Lem.
Columnea cruenta B.D. Morley
Columnea cuspidata L.E. Skog & L.P. Kvist
Columnea dictyophylla Donn. Sm.
Columnea dielsii Mansf.
Columnea dimidiata (Benth.) Kuntze
Columnea dissimilis C.V. Morton
Columnea domingensis (Urb.) B.D. Morley
Columnea dressleri Wiehler
Columnea eburnea (Wiehler) L.P. Kvist & L.E. Skog
Columnea elongatifolia L.P. Kvist & L.E. Skog
Columnea ericae Mansf.
Columnea erythrophaea Decne. ex Houll.
Columnea erythrophylla Hanst.
Columnea eubracteata Mansf.
Columnea fawcettii (Urb.) C.V. Morton
Columnea fernandezii M. Amaya
Columnea filamentosa L.E. Skog
Columnea filifera (Wiehler) L.E. Skog & L.P. Kvist
Columnea filipes Oliver
Columnea fimbricalyx L.P. Kvist & L.E. Skog
Columnea flaccida Seem.
Columnea flava Martens & Galeotti
Columnea flexiflora L.P. Kvist & L.E. Skog
Columnea florida C.V. Morton
Columnea formosa (C.V. Morton) C.V. Morton
Columnea fritschii (Rusby) J.F. Sm.
Columnea fuscihirta L.P. Kvist & L.E. Skog
Columnea gallicauda Wiehler
Columnea gigantifolia L.P. Kvist & L.E. Skog
Columnea glabra Oerst.
Columnea glicensteinii Wiehler
Columnea gloriosa Sprague
Columnea grandifolia Rusby
Columnea grisebachiana Kuntze
Columnea guatemalensis Sprague
Columnea guianensis C.V. Morton
Columnea guttata Poepp. in Poepp. & Endl.
Columnea harrisii (Urb.) Britton ex C.V. Morton
Columnea herthae Mansf.
Columnea hiantiflora Wiehler
Columnea hirsuta Swartz, non Auct.
Columnea hirsutissima C.V. Morton
Columnea hirta Klotzsch & Hanst.
Columnea hispida Swartz
Columnea hypocyrtantha (Wiehler) J.F. Sm. & L.E. Skog
Columnea illepida H.E. Moore
Columnea inaequilatera Poepp. in Poepp. & Endl.
Columnea incarnata C.V. Morton
Columnea incredibilis L.P. Kvist & L.E. Skog
Columnea isernii Cuatrec.
Columnea kalbreyeriana Masters
Columnea katzensteiniae (Wiehler) L.E. Skog & L.P. Kvist
Columnea kienastiana Regel
Columnea kucyniakii Raymond
Columnea labellosa H. Karst.
Columnea laevis L.P. Kvist & L.E. Skog
Columnea lanata (Seem.) Kuntze
Columnea lariensis Kriebel
Columnea lehmannii Mansf.
Columnea lepidocaula Hanst.
Columnea linearis Oerst.
Columnea longinervosa L.P. Kvist & L.E. Skog
Columnea lophophora Mansf.
Columnea lucifer J.L. Clark
Columnea maculata C.V. Morton
Columnea magnifica Klotzsch ex Oerst.
Columnea manabiana (Wiehler) J.F. Sm. & L.E. Skog
Columnea mastersonii (Wiehler) L.E. Skog & L.P. Kvist
Columnea matudae (Wiehler) L.P. Kvist & L.E. Skog
Columnea medicinalis (Wiehler) L.E. Skog & L.P. Kvist
Columnea mentiens B.D. Morley
Columnea microcalyx Hanst.
Columnea microphylla Klotzsch & Hanst. ex Oerst.
Columnea minor (Hook.) Hanst.
Columnea minutiflora L.P. Kvist & L.E. Skog
Columnea mira B.D. Morley
Columnea moesta Poepp. in Poepp. & Endl.
Columnea moorei C.V. Morton
Columnea nariniana (Wiehler) L.P. Kvist & L.E. Skog
Columnea nematoloba L.P. Kvist & L.E. Skog
Columnea nervosa (Klotzsch ex Oerst.) Hanst.
Columnea nicaraguensis Oerst.
Columnea oblongifolia Rusby
Columnea ochroleuca (Klotzsch ex Oerst.) Hanst.
Columnea oerstediana Klotzsch ex Oerst.
Columnea orientandina (Wiehler) L.P. Kvist & L.E. Skog
Columnea ornata (Wiehler) L.E. Skog & L.P. Kvist
Columnea ovatifolia L.P. Kvist & L.E. Skog
Columnea oxyphylla Hanst.
Columnea pallida Rusby
Columnea panamensis C.V. Morton
Columnea paramicola (Wiehler) L.P. Kvist & L.E. Skog
Columnea parviflora C.V. Morton
Columnea pectinata C.V. Morton
Columnea pedunculata M. Amaya, L.E. Skog & L.P. Kvist
Columnea pendula (Klotzsch ex Oerst.) Hanst.
Columnea perpulchra C.V. Morton
Columnea peruviana Zahlbr.
Columnea picta H. Karst.
Columnea polyantha (Wiehler) L.E. Skog
Columnea poortmannii (Wiehler) L.P. Kvist & L.E. Skog
Columnea praetexta Hanst.
Columnea proctorii Stearn
Columnea pubescens (Griseb.) Kuntze
Columnea pulcherrima C.V. Morton
Columnea pulchra (Wiehler) L.E. Skog
Columnea purpurata Hanst.
Columnea purpureovittata (Wiehler) B.D. Morley
Columnea purpurimarginata L.P. Kvist & L.E. Skog
Columnea purpusii Standl.
Columnea pygmaea J.L. Clark & J.F. Sm.
Columnea querceti Oerst.
Columnea queremalensis M. Amaya, L.E. Skog & L.P. Kvist
Columnea raymondii C.V. Morton
Columnea repens (Hook.) Hanst.
Columnea reticulata M. Amaya, L.E. Skog, C.E. González, & J.F. Sm.
Columnea rileyi (Wiehler) J.F. Sm.
Columnea ringens Regel
Columnea robusta (Wiehler) L.E. Skog
Columnea rosea (C.V. Morton) C.V. Morton
Columnea rubida (C.V. Morton) C.V. Morton
Columnea rubra C.V. Morton
Columnea rubriacuta (Wiehler) L.P. Kvist & L.E. Skog
Columnea rubribracteata L.P. Kvist & L.E. Skog
Columnea rubricalyx L.P. Kvist & L.E. Skog
Columnea rubricaulis Standl.
Columnea rubrocincta C.V. Morton
Columnea rutilans Swartz
Columnea sanguinea (Pers.) Hanst.
Columnea sanguinolenta (Klotzsch ex Oerst.) Hanst.
Columnea scandens L.
Columnea schiedeana Schlechtend.
Columnea schimpffii Mansf.
Columnea segregata B.D. Morley
Columnea sericeo-villosa Suess.
Columnea serrata (Klotzsch ex Oerst.) Hanst.
Columnea silvarum C.V. Morton
Columnea skogii Amaya M.
Columnea spathulata Mansf.
Columnea strigosa Benth.
Columnea subcordata C.V. Morton
Columnea suffruticosa J.F. Sm. & L.E. Skog
Columnea sulcata L.E. Skog & L.P. Kvist
Columnea sulfurea Donn. Sm.
Columnea tandapiana (Wiehler) L.E. Skog & L.P. Kvist
Columnea tenella L.P. Kvist & L.E. Skog
Columnea tenensis (Wiehler) B.D. Morley
Columnea tenuis Klotzsch ex Oerst.
Columnea tessmannii Mansf.
Columnea tincta Griseb.
Columnea tomentulosa C.V. Morton
Columnea trollii Mansf.
Columnea tutunendana (Wiehler) L.E. Skog
Columnea ulei Mansf.
Columnea ultraviolacea J.F. Sm. & L.E. Skog
Columnea urbanii W.T. Stearn
Columnea verecunda C.V. Morton
Columnea villosissima Mansf.
Columnea vinacea C.V. Morton
Columnea vittata (Wiehler) L.E. Skog
Columnea xiphoidea J.F. Sm. & L.E. Skog
Columnea zebrina Raymond

References

External links

Columnea from The Genera of Gesneriaceae
Columnea from The Gesneriad Reference Web
World Checklist of Gesneriaceae

 
Epiphytes
Gesneriaceae genera